Sõmeri is an uninhabited island belonging to the country of Estonia.

The island has an area of 41.3 ha.

Uninhabited islands of Estonia
Ridala Parish